Gordon Russell (August 15, 1929 – January 19, 1981) was an American daytime soap opera writer.

Career 
A former actor, Russell wrote for several daytime soap operas, including Dark Shadows, The Doctors and A Time For Us.  He was hired by the network to write the serial General Hospital but died before he began writing that program.

He is best known for a long run as the writer of One Life to Live, which began in 1971 and lasted until his death. He frequently collaborated with writer Sam Hall, and they worked together on both Dark Shadows and One Life to Live.

Awards and nominations
Daytime Emmy Awards

NOMINATIONS
(1980 & 1981; Best Writing; One Life to Live)

Writers Guild of America Award

NOMINATIONS 
(1979 season; One Life to Live)

Head writing tenure

References

External links

1929 births
1981 deaths
American soap opera writers
American male screenwriters
American male actors
American male television writers
20th-century American male writers
20th-century American screenwriters